Mars Global Surveyor (MGS) was an American robotic space probe developed by NASA's Jet Propulsion Laboratory and launched November 1996. MGS was a global mapping mission that examined the entire planet, from the ionosphere down through the atmosphere to the surface. As part of the larger Mars Exploration Program, Mars Global Surveyor performed atmospheric monitoring for sister orbiters during aerobraking, and helped Mars rovers and lander missions by identifying potential landing sites and relaying surface telemetry.

It completed its primary mission in January 2001 and was in its third extended mission phase when, on 2 November 2006, the spacecraft failed to respond to messages and commands. A faint signal was detected three days later which indicated that it had gone into safe mode. Attempts to recontact the spacecraft and resolve the problem failed, and NASA officially ended the mission in January 2007. MGS remains in a stable near-polar circular orbit at about 450 km altitude and, as of 1996, was expected to crash onto the surface of the planet in 2050.

Objectives
Mars Global Surveyor achieved the following science objectives during its primary mission:
 Characterize the surface features and geological processes on Mars.
 Determine the composition, distribution and physical properties of surface minerals, rocks and ice.
 Determine the global topography, planet shape, and gravitational field.
 Establish the nature of the magnetic field and map the crustal remnant field.
 Monitor global weather and the thermal structure of the atmosphere.
 Study interactions between Mars' surface and the atmosphere by monitoring surface features, polar caps that expand and recede, the polar energy balance, and dust and clouds as they migrate over a seasonal cycle.

Mars Global Surveyor also achieved the following goals of its extended mission:

 Continued weather monitoring to form a continuous set of observations with NASA's Mars Reconnaissance Orbiter, which reached Mars in March 2006.
 Imaging of possible landing sites for the 2007 Phoenix spacecraft, and the 2011 Curiosity rover.
 Observation and analysis of key sites of scientific interest, such as sedimentary-rock outcrop sites.
 Continued monitoring of changes on the surface due to wind and ice.

Mission timeline
 7 November 1996: Launch from Cape Canaveral.
 11 September 1997: Arrival at Mars, began orbit insertion.
 1 April 1999: Primary mapping phase began.
 1 February 2001: First extended mission phase began.
 1 February 2002: Second extended mission phase began.
 1 January 2003: Relay mission began.
 30 March 2004: MGS photographed the Mars Exploration Rover Spirit along with its wheel tracks showing its first 85 sols of travel. 

 1 December 2004: Science and Support mission began.
 April 2005: MGS became the first spacecraft to photograph another spacecraft in orbit around a planet other than Earth when it captured two images of the Mars Odyssey spacecraft and one image of the Mars Express spacecraft. 

 1 October 2006: Extended mission phase began for another two years.
 2 November 2006: Spacecraft suffers an error while attempting to reorient a solar panel and communication was lost.
 5 November 2006: Weak signals were detected, indicating the spacecraft was awaiting instructions. The signal cut out later that day.
 21 November 2006: NASA announces the spacecraft has likely finished its operating career.
 6 December 2006: NASA releases imagery taken by MGS of a newly found gully deposit, suggesting that water still flows on Mars.
 13 April 2007: NASA releases its Preliminary Report on the cause(s) of MGS loss of contact.

Loss of contact
On 2 November 2006, NASA lost contact with the spacecraft after commanding it to adjust its solar panels. Several days passed before a faint signal was received indicating that the spacecraft had entered safe mode and was awaiting further instructions.

On 21 and 22 November 2006, MGS failed to relay communications to the Opportunity rover on the surface of Mars. In response to this complication, Mars Exploration Program manager Fuk Li stated, "Realistically, we have run through the most likely possibilities for re-establishing communication, and we are facing the likelihood that the amazing flow of scientific observations from Mars Global Surveyor is over."

On 13 April 2007, NASA announced the loss of the spacecraft was caused by a flaw in a parameter update to the spacecraft's system software. The spacecraft was designed to hold two identical copies of the system software for redundancy and error checking. Subsequent updates to the software encountered a human error when two independent operators updated separate copies with differing parameters. This was followed by a corrective update that unknowingly included a memory fault which resulted in the loss of the spacecraft.

Originally, the spacecraft was intended to observe Mars for 1 Martian year (approximately 2 Earth years). However, based on the vast amount of valuable science data returned, NASA extended the mission three times. MGS remains in a stable near-polar circular orbit at about 450 km altitude, and was expected to crash onto the surface of the planet at some point after about 2047 at the time of its original launch, having by then spent fifty years orbiting the red planet. This is to prevent contamination of the Martian surface with any germs that may be stuck to the spacecraft.

Spacecraft overview
The spacecraft, fabricated at the Lockheed Martin Astronautics plant in Denver, is a rectangular-shaped box with wing-like projections (solar panels) extending from opposite sides. Most of its mass lies in the box-shaped module occupying the center portion of the spacecraft. This center module is made of two smaller rectangular modules stacked on top of each other, one of which is called the equipment module and holds the spacecraft's electronics, science instruments, and the 1750A mission computer. The other module, called the propulsion module, houses its rocket engines and propellant tanks. The Mars Global Surveyor mission cost about $154 million to develop and build and $65 million to launch. Mission operations and data analysis cost approximately $20 million/year.

Scientific instruments

Five scientific instruments flew aboard MGS:

 The Mars Orbiter Camera (MOC) operated by Malin Space Science Systems – The Mars Orbiter Camera (MOC), originally known as Mars Observer Camera, used 3 instruments: a narrow angle camera that took (black-and-white) high resolution images (usually 1.5 to 12 m per pixel) and red and blue wide angle pictures for context (240 m per pixel) and daily global imaging (7.5 km per pixel). MOC returned more than 240,000 images spanning portions of 4.8 Martian years, from September 1997 and November 2006.
The Mars Orbiter Laser Altimeter (MOLA) – MOLA was designed to determine Mars' global topography. It operated as an altimeter until a portion of the laser reached end-of-life in June 2001. The instrument then functioned as a radiometer until October 2006. 

 The Thermal Emission Spectrometer (TES) – This instrument mapped the mineral composition of the surface by scanning thermal emissions.
 A magnetometer and electron reflectometer (MAG/ER) – This instrument was used to interrogate the planet's magnetic fields and determine that Mars does not have a global magnetic field but rather many smaller localized fields.
 The Ultrastable Oscillator (USO/RS) – Precise clock measurements from this device were used to map variations in the gravitational field.
 The Mars Relay (MR) – The Mars Relay antenna supported the Mars Exploration Rovers for data relay back to Earth in conjunction with the Mars Orbiter Camera's 12 MB memory buffer.

First complete test of aerobraking
The spacecraft was launched from a smaller Delta II rocket, necessitating restrictions in spacecraft weight. In order to achieve the near-circular orbit required for the mission while conserving propellant, the team designed a series of aerobraking maneuvers. Aerobraking had been successfully attempted by the Magellan mission at Venus, but the first complete test of the new procedure was to be carried out by MGS.

Initially, MGS was placed in a highly elliptical orbit that took 45 hours to complete. This would be subsequently be adjusted into its circular science orbit.

During every atmospheric pass, the spacecraft slowed down because of atmospheric resistance. This slowing caused the spacecraft to lose altitude on its next pass through the orbit's apoapsis.

About one month into the mission, it was discovered that air pressure from the planet's atmosphere caused one of the spacecraft's two solar panels to bend backwards. The panel in question had incurred a small amount of damage shortly after launch, the extent of which did not become apparent until subjected to atmospheric forces. MGS had to be raised out of the atmosphere to prevent further damage to the solar panel and a new mission plan had to be developed.

From May to November 1998, aerobraking was temporarily suspended to allow the orbit to drift into the proper position with respect to the Sun and enable optimal use of the solar panels. Although data collection during aerobraking was not in the original mission plan, all science instruments remained functional and acquired vast amounts of data during this "unexpected bonus period of observation". The team was able to evaluate more information about the atmosphere over a range of times rather than the anticipated fixed times of 0200 and 1400, as well as collect data during three close encounters with Phobos.

At this altitude, MGS circled Mars once every two hours. Aerobraking was scheduled to terminate at the same time the orbit drifted into its proper position with respect to the Sun. In the desired orientation for mapping operations, the spacecraft always crossed the day-side equator at 14:00 (local Mars time) moving from south to north. This geometry was selected to enhance the total quality of the science return.

Mission results

Mapping
The nearly polar orbit (inclination = 93°) which is almost perfectly circular, moved from the south pole to the north pole in just under an hour. The altitude was chosen to make the orbit Sun-synchronous, so that all images that were taken by the spacecraft of the same surface features on different dates were taken under identical lighting conditions. After each orbit, the spacecraft viewed the planet 28.62° to the west because Mars had rotated underneath it. In effect, it was always 14:00 for MGS as it moved from one time zone to the next exactly as fast as the Sun. After seven sols and 88 orbits, the spacecraft would approximately retrace its previous path, with an offset of 59 km to the east. This ensured eventual full coverage of the entire surface.

In its extended mission, MGS did much more than study the planet directly beneath it. It commonly performed rolls and pitches to acquire images off its nadir track. The roll maneuvers, called ROTOs (Roll Only Targeting Opportunities), rolled the spacecraft left or right from its ground track to shoot images as much as 30° from nadir. It was possible for a pitch maneuver to be added to compensate for the relative motion between the spacecraft and the planet. This was called a CPROTO (Compensation Pitch Roll Targeting Opportunity), and allowed for some very high resolution imaging by the onboard MOC (Mars Orbiting Camera).

In addition to this, MGS could shoot pictures of other orbiting bodies, such as other spacecraft and the moons of Mars. In 1998 it imaged what was later called the Phobos monolith, found in MOC Image 55103.

After analyzing hundreds of high-resolution pictures of the Martian surface taken by the spacecraft, a team of researchers found that weathering and winds on the planet create landforms, especially sand dunes, remarkably similar to those in some deserts on Earth.

Other discoveries from this mission are:

 The planet was found to have a layered crust to depths of 10 km or more. To produce the layers, large amounts of material had to be weathered, transported and deposited.

 The northern hemisphere is probably just as cratered as the southern hemisphere, but the craters are mostly buried.
 Many features, like impact craters, were buried, then recently exhumed.

 Large areas of Mars are covered by a mantle that coats all but the very steepest slopes.  The mantle is sometimes smooth, sometimes pitted.  Some believe the pits are due to the escape of water through sublimation (ice changing directly to a vapor) of buried ice.

 Some areas are covered by hematite-rich material. The hematite could have been put in place by liquid water in the past.
 Dark streaks were found to be caused by giant dust devils. Dust devil tracks were observed to frequently change; some changed in just one month.

 The south pole's residual cap was observed to look like Swiss cheese, with holes generally a few meters deep.  The holes get bigger each year, so this region or hemisphere may be warming.  Claims that this represents a global trend, however, are cherry-picking regional data versus the planetary dataset, and MOC results versus TES and radio science (see below).

 The Thermal Emission Spectrometer observes in infrared for atmospheric studies and mineralogy. TES found that Mars' planetary climate has cooled since Viking, and just about all of the surface of Mars is covered with volcanic rock.

 Hundreds of house-sized boulders were found in some areas. This indicates that some materials are strong enough to hold together, even when moving downslope. Most of the boulders appeared in volcanic regions so they were probably formed from weathered lava flows.

 Thousands of dark slope streaks were observed. Most scientists believe they result from the avalanching of dust. However, some researchers think that water may be involved.

The Lense–Thirring test

Data from MGS have been used to perform a test of the general relativistic Lense–Thirring precession which consists of a small precession of the orbital plane of a test particle moving around a central, rotating mass such as a planet. The interpretation of these results has been debated.

Further evidence for water on Mars

Hundreds of gullies were discovered that were formed from liquid water, possibly in recent times.

A few channels on Mars displayed inner channels that suggest sustained fluid flows.  The most well-known is the one in Nanedi Valles.  Another was found in Nirgal Vallis.

On 6 December 2006 NASA released photos of two craters in Terra Sirenum and Centauri Montes which appear to show the presence of flowing water on Mars at some point between 1999 and 2001. The pictures were produced by Mars Global Surveyor and are quite possibly the spacecraft's final contribution to our knowledge of Mars and the question of whether water exists on the planet.

Other pictures

See also

 2001 Mars Odyssey, NASA orbiter studying the geology and hydrology of Mars
 
 List of Mars orbiters
 List of missions to Mars
 Mars Express, European Mars orbiter
 
 Mars Reconnaissance Orbiter,  NASA Mars orbiter launched in 2005, still operational
 
 
 
 

 List of software bugs

References

External links

 NASA JPL Mars Link
 NASA mission overview
 Mars Global Surveyor Mission Profile by NASA's Solar System Exploration
 Global Surveyor Mission plan
 Malin Space Science Systems (complete image gallery)
 04/13/07: Mars Global Surveyor: Report Reveals Reasons for Loss.
 New Scientist article on the general relativistic test
 MGS Photographs

 
Mars Exploration Program
Global Surveyor
Global Surveyor
Mars Global Surveyor
Mars Global Surveyor
Mars Global Surveyor
Mars Global Surveyor
Mars Global Surveyor
Geography of Mars